Donald E. Perkins (September 18, 1917 – September 15, 1998) was a professional American football player who played running back for four seasons for the Green Bay Packers and Chicago Bears.

Following his retirement from the NFL, Perkins settled in Waukegan, Illinois with his wife, Doris. The two raised five kids and later relocated southern Missouri after retirement, where Doris and some of their children still live.

References

External links
 Dodgeville star won titles with both the Packers and Bears in the 1940s
 

1917 births
1998 deaths
American football running backs
Green Bay Packers players
Chicago Bears players
Players of American football from Wisconsin
People from Dodgeville, Wisconsin
Wisconsin–Platteville Pioneers football players